The Political and Security Committee (PSC; sometimes referred to by its French COPS acronym derived from Comité politique et de sécurité) is a permanent body within the European Union dealing with Common Foreign and Security Policy issues, including Common Security and Defence Policy.

PSC, which is based in Brussels, consists of ambassadorial-level representatives from all the EU Member States and usually meets twice per week. The PSC is chaired by the European External Action Service (EEAS).

Functions
The main functions of the PSC are keeping track of the international situation, and helping to define EU policies within the CFSP and CSDP. PSC sends guidance to, and receives advice from the European Union Military Committee (EUMC), the Committee for Civilian Aspects of Crisis Management (CIVCOM) as well as the European Union Institute for Security Studies. It is also a forum for dialogue on CSDP matters between the EU Member States.

PSC also drafts opinions for the Foreign Affairs Council, which is one of the configurations of the Council of the European Union. CFSP matters are passed to the Foreign Affairs Council via COREPER II.

Role in command and control of missions

History 

The creation of the PSC was a result of the Treaty of Amsterdam, after which the establishment of the PSC was agreed in principle in December 1999, at the Helsinki European Council. PSC was first established as an interim body in 2000, but in December 2000, at the Nice European Council it was agreed to make it permanent. The formal decision to set up the PSC was taken on January 22, 2001, by the Council of the European Union.

The PSC replaced the previous Political Committee, which met less frequently, and consisted of representatives from the Member States' capitals rather than Brussels-based ambassadors.

Chair 
In 2010 Ambassador Olof Skoog (Sweden) was appointed by the EU High Representative Catherine Ashton to serve as the first Permanent Chair of the EU Political and Security Committee.  He served until September 2013 when he was replaced by Walter Stevens (Belgium).

See also
Common Security and Defence Policy
European External Action Service
Military of the European Union
European Union Military Committee
European Union Military Staff

References

External links
 CSDP structure, instruments, and agencies, EEAS website
 EUMS - European Union Military Staff, EU Whoiswho

Common Security and Defence Policy bodies of the Council of the European Union